Vonray was an American alternative rock band from Orlando, Florida, United States. The group formed around singer/songwriter Vaughan Rhea, originally from Tennessee, who had come to Orlando playing as an acoustic coffee shop act with his brother and co-lyricist, Dave, on bass. Inspired by grunge music, the brothers Rhea put together a band and began playing somewhat harder sounding tunes, though still acoustic-based.  Soon after, the band was opening locally for national acts as they toured through Orlando venues such as Hard Rock Live and House of Blues. They released an independent debut album, Panes, as VonRa in 1997.  A second independent album release, VonRa, followed in 1999, and a third, Fame, came in 2001.

As major-label attention increased, the band scored a high-profile slot opening for fellow Florida-based rockers, Creed, in summer of 2002. The band was signed to Elektra Records in late 2002 and, under the moniker "Vonray," saw their first major label release on Elektra Records in early 2003 (April 8). The band charted a single hit in the US in 2002 with the song "Inside Out," which was featured on the WB Network's television show Smallville, on which the band made an appearance, and its soundtrack; "Inside Out" subsequently peaked at No. 31 on Billboard's US Top 40 Mainstream chart and No. 32 on Billboard's US Hot Adult Top 40 chart. A second single, "I'll Show You,"  followed but received little promotion from the label and failed to chart.  Due to Elektra Records then merging with Atlantic Records, promotion for the band all but ceased, and the band was dropped from the label soon after.  A casualty of the merger, Rhea and the band went on hiatus in October 2003.

Due to the success of an online petition, a fan-demanded reunion show happened September 2007 at Hard Rock Live Orlando. The performance was later featured on Orlando's Orange TV 'LiveWire' program, the video of which was awarded as a 2008 winner at the 29th Annual Telly Awards. An intended DVD release of that historic performance was delayed indefinitely.

Dave Rhea now works for the law firm of Phillips Murrah in Oklahoma City and is currently recording original music in his home studio, with his son Campbell on drums.

Members

Present
Vaughan Rhea – Lead Vocal and Rhythm Guitar
Dave "Boo" Rhea – Bass Guitar and Backing Vocal
Garrett Coleman – Rhythm Guitar and Backing Vocal
Paul Smith – Lead Guitar and Backing Vocal (now with megaphone)
Jeff Irizarry – Drums
Todd Hackenburg – Lead Guitar

Former
Dave Smith – Lead Guitar and Backing Vocal
Dave "Tinman" Tinny – Drums
David Rankin – Guitar
Gibb Droll – Lead Guitar
Kevin Kirkwood – Drums
Ben Tapia – Guitar

Discography

Albums
Panes 1997, independent release
Von Ra 1999, independent release
Fame 2001, independent release
Vonray 2003, Elektra Records

Extended plays
Live at Sapphire Supper Club (EP) 1998, Limited Edition independent release

Singles

Music videos

Other media appearances
Smallville, Vol. 1: The Talon Mix (Soundtrack) 2001, Elektra Records / WeaThe Vonray track "Inside Out" was selected for inclusion on the soundtrack album.

References

External links

Musical groups from Orlando, Florida
Alternative rock groups from Florida
American post-grunge musical groups
Elektra Records artists
1996 establishments in Florida
2003 disestablishments in Florida
Musical groups established in 1996
Musical groups disestablished in 2003